"Easy Easy" was a single released by the Scotland national football team in 1974.  It reached number 20 in the UK Singles Chart.

References

1974 singles
Football songs and chants
Scotland national football team songs
1974 songs
Scotland at the 1974 FIFA World Cup
Song articles with missing songwriters